The 2014–15 Bermudian Premier Division is the 52nd season of the highest competitive football league in Bermuda, which was founded in 1963.

Overview
The competition started in September 2014 and finished in March 2015. Dandy Town Hornets were the defending champions, having won their seventh league championship the season before.

Somerset Trojans won the league title in March 2015 after beating Southampton Rangers 3-0 on the final day of the competition, leaving Hornets trailing three points.

Flanagan's Onions and St. George’s Colts were relegated.

Teams

League table

Top scorers

References

Bermudian Premier Division seasons
Bermuda
1